Chen Jian is Hu Shih Professor of History and China-US Relations emeritus at Cornell University. His specialties include modern Chinese history, history of Chinese-American relations, and Cold War international history. He is also Zijiang Distinguished Visiting Professor at East China Normal University and Distinguished Global Network Professor of History at New York University Shanghai.

Chen Jian has held the  Philippe Roman Chair in History and International Affairs at LSE IDEAS (2008-2009), where he remains a Senior Fellow, and was a research scholar from 2009-2013 at the University of Hong Kong. He was also (2013-2014) a Global Fellow of the Woodrow Wilson Center, where he has been a Senior Scholar since 2005. He has also been the Zijiang Distinguished Visiting Professor at East China Normal University since 2000.

Professor Chen received an M.A. from Fudan University and East China Normal University in 1982 and his Ph.D. from Southern Illinois University in 1990.

Awards and honors
Chen Jian was the recipient of the Jeffrey Sean Lehman Grant for Scholarly Exchange with China, Cornell University, 2007. His other fellowships include Jennings Randolph Senior Fellowship for International Peace, United States Institute of Peace, 1996-1997 and the Norwegian Nobel Institute Fellowship, Oslo, Norway, 1993.

In 2005, he shared in the honors for an Emmy Award for Outstanding Achievement in News and Documentary Research for Declassified: Nixon in China.

Contributions and reception

Chen's first major book was China's Road to the Korean War, which received much praise and was widely cited. 
 Lucian Pye, writing in Foreign Affairs  said Mao's China and the Cold War has "taken some giant steps toward advancing the West's understanding of Mao Zedong's policies during the Cold War." Pye praised Chen for correcting the view of Mao and Zhou Enlai as "relaxed and worldly wise" pragmatists, a view put forward by Richard Nixon and Henry Kissinger to justify the opening to China. In fact, Chen argues, "Mao was driven by ideology and insatiable ambition as he led the communists to power and sought Stalin's blessing for his leadership." Allen Whiting's review of it in Political Science Quarterly called Chen's work a "superb study."

Bibliography

 Zouxiang quanqiu zhanzheng zhilu: erci dazhan qiyuan yanjiu (The Road to a Global War: A Chinese Study of the Origins of the Second World War; Shanghai: Xuelin, 1989).
 China's Road to the Korean War: The Making of the Sino-American Confrontation (New York: Columbia University Press, 1994)
 Chinese Communist Foreign Policy and the Cold War in Asia: New Documentary Evidence, 1944-1950 (co-edited with Zhang Shuguang; Chicago: Imprint Publications, 1996)
 The China Challenge in the 21st Century: Implications for US Foreign Policy (Washington, DC: US Institute of Peace, 1998)
 Mao's China and the Cold War (Chapel Hill, NC: The University of North Carolina Press, 2001)

References

External links
Chen Jian homepage at the Cornell University Department of History

Year of birth missing (living people)
Living people
Historians of China
Cornell University Department of History faculty
Fudan University alumni
East China Normal University alumni